Paul Liu Jinghe (26 December 1920 - 11 December 2013) was a Chinese Roman Catholic Bishop of Roman Catholic Diocese of Hebei, China. He was also the vice-president of Chinese Patriotic Catholic Association and vice-president of the Bishops Conference of the Catholic Church in China (BCCCC).

He was a member of the 6th, 7th, 8th and 9th National Committee of the Chinese People's Political Consultative Conference.

Biography
Liu was born in Fengrun District, Tangshan, Hebei, on December 26, 1920, to a Catholic family. From 1926 to 1931 He attended the Huanghuagang Missionary School. In 1939 he was accepted to the Beijing Wensheng College, majoring in philosophy, where he graduated in 1945.

On May 4, 1945, he was consecrated as priest by Bishop of the Catholic Diocese of Beijing Paul Leon Cornelius Montaigne, C.M. He was sent to jail in 1946 and released in March of the following year. On November 13, 1954, he was imprisoned in the Tangshan No. 1 Detention House. During the Cultural Revolution, the Communist government suppressed freedom of religious belief. Liu was re-imprisoned. In the autumn of 1970 he was sent to textile mill, quarry and coke-oven plant to reform through labour. After the 3rd Plenary Session of the 11th Central Committee of the Communist Party of China, the policy of religious freedom was implemented. On December 20, 1981, he was ordained bishop by Bishop Chang Shouyi, John Wang Qiwei and Pan Shaoqing. On December 7, 1984, he founded the Hebei Catholic Seminary. He retired on November 17, 2010. On October 20, 2010, He refused to attend Joseph Guo Jincai's illegal pastoral ceremony in Chengde Diocese. Liu died on December 11, 2013.

References

1920 births
2013 deaths
Politicians from Tangshan
21st-century Roman Catholic bishops in China
People's Republic of China politicians from Hebei
20th-century Roman Catholic bishops in China